The Leisure Class is a 2015 black comedy farce television film by HBO Films about a man who is trying to marry into a wealthy family and his unpredictable brother. The film was directed by Project Greenlight season four contest winner, Jason Mann, written by Project Greenlight season one winner Pete Jones and Mann, and produced by Effie T. Brown and Marc Jouburt. It is based on a 2012 short film produced and co-written by Mann that premiered at the 2013 Raindance Film Festival. Season 4 of Project Greenlight aired on HBO as a documentary series chronicling the selection of Mann and the production of the film. The film premiered in Los Angeles in August 2015 and aired on HBO on November 2, 2015 to universal negative reception with a 0% on Rotten Tomatoes.

Production
In November 2014, it was announced that Mann had won Project Greenlight's season 4 contest to direct a film for HBO. Originally the contest winner was going to direct Not Another Pretty Woman, a broad comedy screenplay. However, after Mann shared the script for a full-length version of a short film he had written, The Leisure Class, it was decided he would instead direct that script. HBO set the film's budget at $3 million.

Casting
The main character is played by Ed Weeks, and his brother, Leonard, is played by Tom Bell. The matriarch of the wealthy family is played by Brenda Strong. The film's cast also includes Bruce Davison, Rory Knox Johnston, Christine Lakin, Bridget Regan, Scottie Thompson, and Melanie Zanetti.

Reception
The Leisure Class received negative reviews from critics. On Rotten Tomatoes, the film has a rating of 0%, based on 9 reviews, with an average rating of 3.9/10. On Metacritic, the film has a score of 25 out of 100, based on 7 critics, indicating "generally unfavorable reviews".

References

External links
 Project Greenlight
 

2015 films
2015 comedy films
American comedy films
HBO Films films
Pearl Street Films films
2010s English-language films
2010s American films